Jinshiqiao Station, is a station of Line 3 of the Tianjin Metro. It started operations on 1 October 2012.

References

Railway stations in Tianjin
Railway stations in China opened in 2012
Tianjin Metro stations